Events in the year 2016 in South Sudan.

Incumbents
 President: Salva Kiir Mayardit
 Vice President: James Wani Igga 
 First Vice President: Riek Machar (April–July), Taban Deng Gai (from 23 July)

Events

South Sudanese Civil War continues.

 23 June – a larger battle south of Wau initiated the 2016–17 Wau clashes.

 7-11 July – in the Juba clashes, a total of 300 people were killed.

 9 July – Coins for £1 SSP and £2 SSP are released to complete the coin series of the South Sudanese pound.

Sport

 5-21 August – South Sudan at the 2016 Summer Olympics: 3 competitors in 1 sport (athletics).

Deaths
15 March – Arkangelo Bari Wanji, politician (b. 1936).

References

 
2010s in South Sudan
Years of the 21st century in South Sudan
South Sudan
South Sudan